DataMotion, Inc. is a privately held company based in Florham Park, NJ.  The company was founded in 1999 by Mahesh Muchhala and Bob Janáček as a spin-off of SafetyNet.   
Originally called CertifiedMail.com and based in Springfield, NJ, the company changed its name to DataMotion in October 2008.  Corporate offices were moved to Morristown in 2004. The company also maintains an office in Portland, Oregon. 
DataMotion provides secure information transport services and products to businesses, including email encryption, secure file transfer and secure electronic form delivery. The company sells its services and products primarily to entities with 100 employees or more, in industries including healthcare, financial services and government.

History 

In September 2009 DataMotion was placed in the visionary quadrant of the 2009 Gartner File Transfer Magic Quadrant.  In April 2010 the company announced a reseller partnership with EasyLink Services. EasyLink resells DataMotion SecureMail and other document delivery solutions.  In March 2011 an agreement with Jamcracker Services Delivery Network was announced, offering DataMotion SecureMail through Jamcracker's delivery network.  In April 2012 the company announced the second generation DataMotion Platform,  making it available to systems integrators and solutions providers as well as enterprise end users.  This platform-as-a-service (PaaS) provides a secure data delivery hub that can be leveraged for unified data delivery. In October 2012 the company announced DataMotion Direct, a secure email service that enables healthcare industry organizations to integrate with the Direct Project. The Direct Project enables healthcare organizations and providers to comply with Meaningful Use Stage 2 data transfer requirements established by the Centers for Medicare & Medicaid Services (CMS).  DataMotion also began operations as a health information service provider (HISP) in October 2012. 
All products are available as on-premises, SaaS (Software-as-a-service) or hybrid solutions.

Patents 

Mr. Janacek and Mr. Muchhala filed for a patent in May 2000 for developing a method for secure transmission of a message via a network where a recipient of the message need not be a party to the network or maintain an active address in the network, US patent # 6684348. The patent was granted in 2004.  This patent was the basis for the company's first product, self-provisioning email encryption.

On May 21, 2013, DataMotion was issued a second patent, US patent No. 8447967 for its system for the secure transmission of messages that may be included with existing automated message handling software applications.

Products 

The company first introduced SaaS-based email encryption in 1999.  An updated version of this product is still offered today as SecureMail Desktop.  Several products have been added since that time. Other products sold include:
SecureMail Gateway– an email encryption filter
SecureContact– inbound-initiated email encryption
Secure File Transfer– file delivery encryption
eForms– secure electronic form delivery 
DataMotion Direct– Secure email and file delivery for healthcare through the Direct Project

References

External links 
 Official website
 Top 10 Review
 SC Magazine Review

Companies based in New Jersey